Type 366 radar is the Chinese development of Russian MR-331 Mineral-ME naval radar (NATO reporting name: Band Stand), and as late as the 2010s, it is the latest and most advanced surface search radar of the Chinese navy.

History 
MR-331 Mineral-ME radar system consists of Mineral-ME1 active radar and Mineral-ME2 passive radar mounted in a back-to-back configuration, and Mineral-ME3 mutual data exchange, navigation and joint combat operation control station, Mineral-ME radar system is designed to detect, track and record (including over-the-horizon) surface targets, provide and receive information to and from other sources. Typical  detection range against a destroyer sized target in the active mode in up to 250 km, while that of the passive mode ranges from 80 to 450 km. Active and passive subsystems of MR-331 Mineral-ME can operate in conjunction. MR-331 Mineral-ME is installed on Sovremennyy-class destroyer sold to China, and China also purchased additional sets for its own destroyers.

China was thoroughly impressed by the performance of Russian MR-331 Mineral-ME naval radar and proceeded to develop its own version designated as Type 366. The major Chinese modification of the Russian system is in the data exchange and operator console, where China has improved mode of operations. Like its Russian predecessor, Type 366 radar operates in five different frequency bands and when working in the active mode, the number of targets can be handled is three times of that of when in passive mode.  Type 366 radar is claimed to be superior than its Russian predecessor is when active and passive subsystems work in conjunction. In comparison to the original surface search function of its Russian predecessor, China expanded the functions on Type 366 radar by also using it as a low-altitude 2-D air search radar against sea-skimming anti-shipping missiles. With improved software, Type 366 radar is proven to be effective against sea-skimming target with radar cross section of 0.1 to 1 square meter by detecting such incoming targets at distance of 20 to 35 km range.

See also 
 Chinese radars
 Naval Weaponry of the People's Liberation Army Navy

References 

Naval radars
Military radars of the People's Republic of China